A wrap dress is generic term for a dress with a front closure formed by wrapping one side across the other, and is fastened at the side or tied at the back. This forms a V-shaped neckline. A faux wrap dress resembles this design, except that it comes already fastened together with no opening in front, but instead is slipped on over the head. A wrap top is a top cut and constructed in the same way as a wrap dress, but without a skirt. The design of wrap-style closure in European garments was the results of the heavy influences of Orientalism which was popular in the 19th century.

History 

Wrap-over neckline which closes to the right side originated in China and can be traced back to the Shang dynasty (1600 to 1046 B.C) before spreading to other countries (such as Korea and Japan) while wrap-over neckline which closes to the left were basic styles of garments which were widely used in Central Asia and East Asia, as well as Europe, from West Asia.

East Asia

China 

Japan 
The  was adopted by the Japanese in 718 AD through the Yoro Code which stipulated that all robes had to be closed from the left to the right in a typical Chinese way.

The  originated from the Chinese , which gained popularity in the 8th century Japanese court.

Orientalism, Europe, and America 

European clothing with wrap-style closure were heavily influenced by the popularity of Orientalism in the 19th century. In the 20th century, Chinoiserie in fashion gained popularity and impacted many fashion designers of the time, including fashion designed based in the United States. According to the Ladies’ Home Journal of June 1913, volume 30, issue 6:Chinoiserie continued to be popular in the 1920s and was a major influence in the dress feature and fashion design of this period; simultaneously, Japonisme also had a profound impact by influencing new forms of clothing designs of this period; for example, the use of wrap top and obi-like sash as an influence of the Japanese .

During the Great Depression, house dresses called "Hooverettes" were popular which employed a wrap design. Wrap dresses were designed by Elsa Schiaparelli in the 1930s and by Claire McCardell in the 1940s, whose original 'popover' design became the basis for a variety of wrap-around dresses, which was made out of denim. Fashion designer Charles James also designed a wrap dress.

In the early 1970s, Orientalism re-emerged as the West officially expressed eagerness towards the Far East. Oriental fashion, thus, re-surfaced in American fashion wear; American designers also showed these Oriental influences in their creation designs. The wrap-around lounging wear, which was inspired by the native Chinese dress, gained popularity among women during this period.

Diane von Fürstenberg's wrap dress 

Although it is often claimed that Diane von Fürstenberg 'invented' what is known as the wrap dress in 1972/73, Richard Martin, a former curator of the Costume Institute at the Metropolitan Museum of Art, noted that the form of Fürstenberg's design had already been "deeply embedded into the American designer sportswear tradition," with her choice of elastic, synthetic fabrics distinguishing her work from earlier wrap dresses. Her design is actually a two-pieces dress where a wrap top is sewn to a skirt, similar to the making of the Chinese shenyi.

The Fürstenberg interpretation of the wrap dress, which was consistently knee-length, in a clinging jersey, with long sleeves, was so popular and so distinctive that the style has generally become associated with her. She has stated that her divorce inspired the design, and also suggested it was created in the spirit of enabling women to enjoy sexual freedom.

Wrap dresses achieved their peak of popularity in the mid to late 1970s, and the design has been credited with becoming a symbol of women's liberation in the 1970s. They experienced renewed popularity beginning in the late 1990s, particularly after von Fürstenberg reintroduced her wrap dress in 1997; she, among others, has continued to design wrap dresses since then. The wrap dress's popularity and its quick disrobing, and perceived feminist significance have remained current into the mid-2010s. In 2004 a book dedicated entirely to Fürstenberg's wrap dresses was published.

See also 
Robe
Wrap (clothing)
Chinoiserie in fashion
Japonism

Gallery

Notes

References

External links

A 1970s von Fürstenberg jersey wrap dress at the Metropolitan Museum of Art
"Diane von Fürstenberg 'Journey of a Dress' exhibition opens in L.A." by Booth Moore, Los Angeles Times, January 10, 2014

Dresses
1970s fashion
1990s fashion
2010s fashion
Feminism and the arts